The 2007 Winnipeg Blue Bombers season was the 50th season for the team in the Canadian Football League and their 75th overall. They attempted to win their 11th Grey Cup championship, but they lost in the Grey Cup game against the Saskatchewan Roughriders.

Offseason

CFL draft

Regular season

Season standings

Season schedule

Roster

Playoffs

East Semi-Final
Date and time: Sunday, November 11, 2:00 PM Central Standard TimeVenue: Canad Inns Stadium, Winnipeg, Manitoba

East Final
Date and time: Sunday, November 18, 1:00 PM Central Standard TimeVenue: Rogers Centre, Toronto, Ontario

Grey Cup
Date and time: Sunday, November 25, 5:30 PM Central Standard TimeVenue: Rogers Centre, Toronto, Ontario

References

External links

Winnipeg Blue Bombers
Winnipeg Blue Bombers seasons